DayxDay is an American web series directed by Gianennio Salucci starring singer-songwriter Zella Day.

Background

DayxDay was created by Gianennio Salucci and Zella Day as a way for "further the connection with whomever is listening to [her] music."

Format
The show is sometimes in the style of a documentary series, documenting Day with friends and performing, but at other times has episodes that are more like art films featuring clips of the ocean, Day in tunnels full of graffiti, and playing the tambourine in her house.

Cast
 Zella Day, an American singer songwriter from Pinetop, Arizona.
 Børns, Day's roommate and friend who is also a fellow musician. The two collaborated on an acoustic version of his song "Electric Love".

Episodes

References

American non-fiction web series
2014 web series debuts